Monocrepidius exsul, known generally as the pasture wireworm or sugarcane wireworm, is a species of click beetle in the family Elateridae.

References

Elateridae
Articles created by Qbugbot
Beetles described in 1877